Kodori or Kodor may refer to one of the following entities:

Kodori (village), a village in eastern Abkhazia
Kodori (river), the second largest river of Abkhazia
Kodori Valley, the valley through which the river Kodori flows
2001 Kodori crisis, a confrontation in the Kodori Valley between Georgians and Abkhazians
Battle of the Kodori Valley, a military operation of 2008 during the Russo-Georgian War
 Kodor, the Hungarian name for Codor village, Jichișu de Jos Commune, Cluj County, Romania